Lincoln is a 2012 American biographical historical drama film directed and produced by Steven Spielberg, starring Daniel Day-Lewis as United States President Abraham Lincoln. It also features Sally Field, David Strathairn, Joseph Gordon-Levitt, James Spader, Hal Holbrook and Tommy Lee Jones in supporting roles.

The screenplay by Tony Kushner was loosely based on Doris Kearns Goodwin's 2005 biography Team of Rivals: The Political Genius of Abraham Lincoln, and covers the final four months of Lincoln's life, focusing on his efforts in January 1865 to abolish slavery and involuntary servitude by having the Thirteenth Amendment to the United States Constitution passed by the United States House of Representatives.

The film was produced by Spielberg and frequent collaborator Kathleen Kennedy, through their respective production companies, Amblin Entertainment and the Kennedy/Marshall Company. Filming began October 17, 2011, and ended on December 19, 2011. Lincoln premiered on October 8, 2012 at the New York Film Festival. The film was co-produced by American companies DreamWorks Pictures, 20th Century Fox, and Participant Media, with Indian company Reliance Entertainment, and released theatrically by Touchstone Pictures in North America on November 16, 2012. It was distributed by 20th Century Fox in international territories.

Lincoln was acclaimed by critics, who lauded its acting (especially Day-Lewis), Spielberg's direction, and its production values. In December 2012, it was nominated for seven Golden Globe Awards, including Best Motion Picture – Drama, Best Director for Spielberg, and winning Best Actor (Motion Picture – Drama) for Day-Lewis. At the 85th Academy Awards, it was nominated for twelve Academy Awards including Best Picture and Best Director; it won for Best Production Design and Best Actor for Day-Lewis. It was also a commercial success, grossing over $275 million at the box office.

Plot 

In January 1865, United States President Abraham Lincoln expects the Civil War to end soon, with the defeat of the Confederate States. He is concerned that his 1863 Emancipation Proclamation may be discarded by the courts after the war and that the proposed Thirteenth Amendment will be defeated by the returning slave states. He feels it imperative to pass the amendment beforehand, to remove any possibility that freed slaves might be re-enslaved.

The Radical Republicans fear the amendment will be defeated by some who wish to delay its passage; support from Republicans in the border states is not yet assured. The amendment also requires the support of several Democratic congressmen to pass. With dozens of Democrats being lame ducks after losing their re-election campaigns in the fall of 1864, some of Lincoln's advisors believe he should wait for a new Republican-heavy Congress. Lincoln remains adamant about having the amendment in place before the war is concluded and the southern states are re-admitted.

Lincoln's hopes rely upon Francis Preston Blair, a founder of the Republican Party whose influence could win over members of the border state conservative faction. With Union victory in the Civil War highly likely but not yet secured, and with two sons serving in the Union Army, Blair is keen to end hostilities quickly before the spring thaw arrives and the armies march again. Therefore, in return for his support, Blair insists that Lincoln allow him to engage the Confederate government in peace negotiations. However, Lincoln knows that significant support for the amendment comes from Radical Republicans, for whom negotiated peace is unacceptable. Unable to proceed without Blair's support, Lincoln reluctantly authorizes Blair's mission.

In the meantime, Lincoln and Secretary of State William Seward work to secure Democratic votes for the amendment. Lincoln suggests they concentrate on the lame-duck Democrats, as they will feel freer to vote as they choose and soon need employment; Lincoln will have many federal jobs to fill as he begins his second term. Though Lincoln and Seward are unwilling to offer monetary bribes to the Democrats, they authorize agents to contact Democratic congressmen with offers of federal jobs in exchange for their support. Meanwhile, Lincoln's son, Robert, returns from law school and announces his intention to discontinue his studies and enlist in the Union Army, hoping to earn a measure of honor and respect outside of his father's shadow before the war's end. Lincoln reluctantly secures an officer's commission for Robert. The First Lady is aghast, fearing that he will be killed. She furiously presses her husband to pass the amendment and end the war, promising woe upon him if he should fail.

At a critical moment in the debate in the House of Representatives, racial-equality advocate Thaddeus Stevens agrees to moderate his position and argue that the amendment represents only legal equality, not a declaration of actual equality. Meanwhile, Confederate envoys are ready to meet with Lincoln to discuss terms for peace, but he instructs they be kept out of Washington as the amendment approaches a vote on the House floor. Rumor of their mission circulates, prompting both Democrats and conservative Republicans to advocate postponing the vote. In a carefully worded statement, Lincoln denies there are envoys in Washington, and the vote proceeds, passing by a margin of just two votes. Black visitors to the gallery celebrate, and Stevens returns home to his "housekeeper" and lover, a biracial woman.

When Lincoln meets with the Confederates, he tells them slavery cannot be restored, as the North is united for ratification of the amendment, and several of the southern states' reconstructed legislatures would also vote to ratify. As a result, the peace negotiations fail, and the war continues. On April 3, Lincoln visits the battlefield at Petersburg, Virginia, where he exchanges a few words with Lieutenant General Ulysses S. Grant. On April 9, Grant receives General Robert E. Lee's surrender at Appomattox Courthouse. On April 14, a cheerful Lincoln expresses to his wife that they will be happy in the future and later meets members of his cabinet to discuss future measures to enfranchise blacks, before leaving for Ford's Theatre. That night, while Lincoln's son Tad is watching Aladdin and the Wonderful Lamp at Grover's Theatre, the manager suddenly stops the play to announce that the President has been shot. The next morning, at the Petersen House, Lincoln dies with a peaceful expression across his face; in a flashback, Lincoln finishes his second inaugural address on March 4 with Lincoln intoning the words, "With malice toward none, with charity for all...".

Cast 
Lincoln household
 Daniel Day-Lewis as President of the United States Abraham Lincoln
 Sally Field as First Lady Mary Todd Lincoln
 Gloria Reuben as Elizabeth Keckley, a former slave who was dressmaker and confidante to Mary Todd Lincoln
 Joseph Gordon-Levitt as Robert Todd Lincoln
 Gulliver McGrath as Tad Lincoln
 Stephen McKinley Henderson as Lincoln's valet William Slade
 Elizabeth Marvel as Mrs. Jolly
 Bill Camp as Mr. Jolly

Union Army
 Adam Driver as Samuel Beckwith, Lincoln's telegraph operator, historically Grant's operator
 Jared Harris as Lieutenant General Ulysses S. Grant
Clarence Key as Inspector General Seth Williams
 Asa-Luke Twocrow as Lieutenant Colonel Ely S. Parker, a Native American Military Secretary to Grant and drafter of the terms of the Confederate Army's surrender at Appomattox Court House
 Colman Domingo as Private Harold Green
 David Oyelowo as Corporal Ira Clark
 Lukas Haas as First White Soldier
 Dane DeHaan as Second White Soldier

White House
 David Strathairn as Secretary of State William H. Seward. Strathairn played Lincoln in the audiobook of the Lincoln/Douglas debates.
 Bruce McGill as Secretary of War Edwin M. Stanton
 Joseph Cross as Major John Hay, Lincoln's military secretary
 Jeremy Strong as John George Nicolay, Lincoln's private secretary
 Grainger Hines as Secretary of the Navy Gideon Welles
 Richard Topol as Attorney General James Speed
 Dakin Matthews as Secretary of the Interior John Palmer Usher
 Walt Smith as Secretary of the Treasury William P. Fessenden
 James Ike Eichling as Postmaster General William Dennison, Jr.

House of Representatives
 Tommy Lee Jones as Republican Congressman Thaddeus Stevens of Pennsylvania. A leader of the Radical Republicans and a fervent abolitionist, Stevens feared that Lincoln would "turn his back on emancipation."
 Lee Pace as Democratic Congressman Fernando Wood of New York
 Peter McRobbie as Democratic Congressman George H. Pendleton of Ohio, leader of the Democratic opposition
 Bill Raymond as Speaker of the House Schuyler Colfax of Indiana, a Republican
 David Costabile as Republican Congressman James Ashley of Ohio
 Stephen Spinella as radical Republican Congressman Asa Vintner Litton
 Michael Stuhlbarg as Democratic Congressman George Yeaman of Kentucky
 Boris McGiver as Democratic Congressman Alexander Coffroth of Pennsylvania
 Walton Goggins as Democratic Congressman Clay Hawkins of Ohio
 David Warshofsky as Congressman William Hutton, whose brother died in the war
 Michael Stanton Kennedy as Republican Congressman Hiram Price of Iowa
 Raynor Scheine as Republican Congressman Josiah S. "Beanpole" Burton of Missouri
 Christopher Evan Welch as Clerk of the House Edward McPherson
 Wayne Duvall as Bluff Wade, an abolitionist radical Republican from Ohio.

Republican Party
 Hal Holbrook as Francis Preston Blair. Blair was an influential Republican politician who tried to arrange a peace agreement between the Union and the Confederacy. Holbrook portrayed Lincoln in the 1976 miniseries Carl Sandburg's Lincoln and in the 1980s North and South miniseries.
 James Spader as Republican Party operative William N. Bilbo. Bilbo had been imprisoned but was freed by Lincoln, then lobbied for passage of the Thirteenth Amendment.
 Tim Blake Nelson as lobbyist Richard Schell. Schell was a Democratic lobbyist who worked with Republicans to obtain votes in the House for passage of the Thirteenth Amendment to the United States Constitution.
 John Hawkes as Republican operative Colonel Robert Latham
 Byron Jennings as Conservative Republican Montgomery Blair, son of Francis Preston Blair
 Julie White as Elizabeth Blair Lee, a daughter of Francis Preston Blair. She wrote hundreds of letters documenting events during the Civil War.
 S. Epatha Merkerson as Lydia Smith, Thaddeus Stevens's biracial housekeeper
 Wayne Duvall as Radical Republican Senator Benjamin "Bluff Ben" Wade
 John Hutton as Senator Charles Sumner

Confederate States
 Jackie Earle Haley as Confederate States Vice President Alexander H. Stephens. Stephens had served with Lincoln in Congress as Whig party representatives from 1847 to 1849. He met with Lincoln on the steamboat River Queen at the unsuccessful Hampton Roads Conference on February 3, 1865.
 Gregory Itzin as John Archibald Campbell. Campbell was a former Supreme Court Justice who resigned at the start of the war, then served as Assistant Secretary of War in the Confederate government. He was also a member of the Confederate delegation that met with Lincoln at the Hampton Roads Conference.
 Michael Shiflett as the third Confederate delegate to Hampton Roads, Senate President Robert M. T. Hunter
 Christopher Boyer (non-speaking role) as Robert E. Lee

Production

Development 

While consulting on a Steven Spielberg project in 1999, Goodwin  told Spielberg she was planning to write Team of Rivals, and Spielberg immediately told her he wanted the film rights. DreamWorks finalized the deal in 2001, and by the end of the year, John Logan signed on to write the script. His draft focused on Lincoln's friendship with Frederick Douglass. Playwright Paul Webb was hired to rewrite, and filming was set to begin in January 2006, but Spielberg delayed it out of dissatisfaction with the script. Liam Neeson said Webb's draft covered the entirety of Lincoln's term as president.

Tony Kushner replaced Webb. Kushner considered Lincoln "the greatest democratic leader in the world" and found the writing assignment daunting because "I have no idea [what made him great]; I don't understand what he did any more than I understand how William Shakespeare wrote Hamlet or Mozart wrote Così fan tutte." Kushner said Lincoln's abolitionist ideals made him appealing to a Jewish writer, and although he felt Lincoln was Christian, he noted the president rarely quoted the New Testament and that his "thinking and his ethical deliberation seem very talmudic". By late 2008, Kushner joked he was on his "967,000th book about Abraham Lincoln". Kushner's initial 500-page draft focused on four months in the life of Lincoln, and by February 2009 he had rewritten it to focus on two months in Lincoln's life when he was preoccupied with adopting the Thirteenth Amendment.

Casting 
Spielberg approached Daniel Day-Lewis about the project in 2003, but Day-Lewis turned down the part at the time, believing the idea of himself playing Lincoln "preposterous". Liam Neeson was cast as Lincoln in January 2005, having worked previously with Spielberg in Schindler's List. In preparation for the role, Neeson studied Lincoln extensively. However, in July 2010, Neeson left the project, saying that he had grown too old for the part. Neeson was 58 at the time, and Lincoln, during the period depicted, was 55 and 56. In an interview with GQ, Neeson said he realized during a table read that the part was not right for him in "a thunderbolt moment" and after the read requested that Spielberg recast his role. Co-star Sally Field, in a 2012 PBS interview, intimated that Neeson's decision was influenced by the death of his wife Natasha Richardson less than a year earlier. In November 2010, it was announced that Day-Lewis would replace Neeson in the role.

While promoting Indiana Jones and the Kingdom of the Crystal Skull in May 2008, Spielberg announced his intention to start filming in early 2009, for release in November, ten months after the 200th anniversary of Lincoln's birth. In January 2009, Taunton and Dighton, Massachusetts were being scouted as potential locations. Spielberg arranged a $50 million budget for the film, to please Paramount Pictures CEO Brad Grey, who had previously delayed the project over concerns it was too similar to Spielberg's commercially unsuccessful Amistad (1997). Spielberg had wanted Touchstone Pictures – which agreed to distribute all his films from 2010 – to distribute the film, but he was unable to afford paying off Paramount, which had collaborated with DreamWorks on the film's development.

Filming 
Filming took place in Richmond, Fredericksburg, and Petersburg, Virginia. In reference to Petersburg, according to location manager Colleen Gibbons, "one thing that attracted the filmmakers to the city was the 180-degree vista of historic structures" which is "very rare".

The Virginia State Capitol served as the exteriors and interiors of the U.S Capitol, and the exteriors of the White House. The House of Delegates inside the building was remodeled to fit for the House of Representatives Chamber set. Scenes representing Grover's Theatre were filmed in Richmond, Virginia at Virginia Repertory Theatre's November Theatre.

Music 

John Williams composed and conducted the score. It was recorded by the Chicago Symphony Orchestra and the Chicago Symphony Chorus. The soundtrack album was released by Sony Classical on November 2, 2012.

All music was composed by Williams except "Battle Cry of Freedom," which was written in 1862 by American composer George Frederick Root (1820–1895) during the American Civil War. Williams composed Track 6, "With Malice Toward None", for Chris Martin, principal trumpeter of the Chicago Symphony Orchestra at the time.

Release 
Lincoln premiered at the New York Film Festival on October 8, 2012. It was also screened at the 2012 AFI Film Festival on November 8, 2012. Walt Disney Studios Motion Pictures distributed it in North America under its Touchstone Pictures banner, while 20th Century Fox distributed it internationally. Disney Publishing Worldwide released several companion books and ancillary literature in anticipation of the film, including Lincoln: A Cinematic and Historical Companion and Lincoln: A Spielberg Film – Discover the Story. DreamWorks and Google Play released the film's trailer during a Google+ hangout with Spielberg and Joseph Gordon-Levitt on September 13, 2012. A teaser trailer was released on September 10, 2012.

Lincoln was released by Touchstone Home Entertainment on Blu-ray, DVD, and digital download in North America on March 26, 2013. Both of the Blu-ray releases included featurettes to accompany this film titled "The Journey to Lincoln", and "A Historic Tapestry: Richmond, Virgina" which discussed the filming of Lincoln by Spielberg in Richmond. It debuted at No. 1 in Blu-ray and DVD sales in its first week. Disney Educational Productions donated DVDs and a teaching guide, Stand Tall: Live Like Lincoln, to more than 37,100 secondary schools in the United States after Spielberg received letters from educators who wished to incorporate the film into their curriculum.

Reception

Box office 
Lincoln earned $182,207,973 in North America from 2,293 theaters and $93,085,477 overseas for a total of $275,293,450, well exceeding its $65 million budget. The film had a limited opening in 11 theaters with $944,308 and an average of $85,846 per theater. It opened at the #15 rank, becoming the highest opening of a film with such a limited release. It opened in 1,175 theaters with $21,049,406 and an average of $11,859 per theater. Disney produced additional prints of the film to accommodate theater demand.

Critical response 
Lincoln received widespread critical acclaim. The cast was lauded, especially Day-Lewis, Field and Jones. The film holds an 89% approval rating on the review aggregation website Rotten Tomatoes, based on 284 reviews with an average rating of 8.00/10. The website's critical consensus reads, "Daniel Day-Lewis characteristically delivers in this witty, dignified portrait that immerses the audience in its world and entertains even as it informs." On Metacritic, which assigns a rating out of 100 based on reviews from critics, the film has a score of 86 (out of 100) based on 44 reviews, indicating "universal acclaim", thus making it Spielberg's highest-rated film on the site since Saving Private Ryan. Audiences polled by CinemaScore gave the film an average grade of "A" on an A+ to F scale.

Roger Ebert of the Chicago Sun-Times gave the film 4 out of 4 stars and said, "The hallmark of the man, performed so powerfully by Daniel Day-Lewis in Lincoln, is calm self-confidence, patience and a willingness to play politics in a realistic way." Glenn Kenny of MSN Movies gave it 5 out of 5 stars stating, "It's the most remarkable movie Steven Spielberg has made in quite a spell, and one of the things that makes it remarkable is how it fulfills those expectations by simultaneously ignoring and transcending them."

Colin Covert of the Star Tribune wrote, "Lincoln is one of those rare projects where a great director, a great actor and a great writer amplify one another's gifts. The team of Steven Spielberg, Daniel Day-Lewis and Tony Kushner has brought forth a triumphant piece of historical journalism, a profound work of popular art and a rich examination of one of our darkest epochs." Charlie McCollum of the San Jose Mercury News called the film "one of the finest historical dramas ever committed to film." Despite mostly positive reviews, Rex Reed of The New York Observer wrote, "In all, there's too much material, too little revelation and almost nothing of Spielberg's reliable cinematic flair." However, reviewers were unanimous in their praise of Day-Lewis's performance.

A. O. Scott from The New York Times wrote that the film "is finally a movie about how difficult and costly it has been for the United States to recognize the full and equal humanity of black people" and concluded that the movie was "a rough and noble democratic masterpiece". He also said that Lincoln's concern about his wife's emotional instability and "the strains of a wartime presidency ... produce a portrait that is intimate but also decorous, drawn with extraordinary sensitivity and insight and focused, above all, on Lincoln's character as a politician. This is, in other words, less a biopic than a political thriller, a civics lesson that is energetically staged and alive with moral energy."

As reported in the Maariv newspaper, on February 3, 2013, Israeli Prime Minister Netanyahu and his ministers discussed Spielberg's film, which several of them saw in Israeli cinemas. They debated whether, with the aim of abolishing slavery, the ends justified the means used by Lincoln, and compared Lincoln's predicament with their own complicated situation in the confusing aftermath of the 2013 Israeli elections.

Historian response 
Eric Foner (Columbia University), a Pulitzer Prize-winning historian of the period, claimed in a letter to The New York Times that "The film grossly exaggerates the possibility that by January 1865 the war might have ended with slavery still intact." He also noted, "The 13th Amendment originated not with Lincoln but with a petition campaign early in 1864 organized by the Women's National Loyal League, an organization of abolitionist women headed by Susan B. Anthony and Elizabeth Cady Stanton." Kate Masur (Northwestern University) accused the film of oversimplifying the role of blacks in abolition and dismissed the effort as "an opportunity squandered" in an op-ed for The New York Times. Harold Holzer, the co-chair of the Abraham Lincoln Bicentennial Foundation and author of more than 40 books, served as a consultant to the film and praised it, but also observed that there is "no shortage of small historical bloopers in the movie" in a piece for The Daily Beast. Holzer states, "As for the Spielberg movie's opening scene ... it is almost inconceivable that any uniformed soldier of the day (or civilians, for that matter) would have memorized a speech that, however ingrained in modern memory, did not achieve any semblance of a national reputation until the 20th century."

Barry Bradford, a member of the Organization of American Historians, offered an analysis of some of the finer historical points of the film's representation of clothing, relationships and appearance. Allen Guelzo (Gettysburg College), also writing for The Daily Beast, had some plot criticism, but disagreed with Holzer: "The pains that have been taken in the name of historical authenticity in this movie are worth hailing just on their own terms". In a later interview with the World Socialist Web Site, Guelzo claimed that "the film was 90 percent on the mark, which given the way Hollywood usually does history is saying something" and that it "got with reasonable accuracy a lot of Lincoln's character, the characters of the main protagonists, and the overall debate over the 13th Amendment. The acting and screenwriting were especially well done... I had never thought that Daniel Day-Lewis was acting, because what he portrayed seemed so close to my own mental image of what Lincoln must have been like." A historian has suggested that the depiction of Lincoln's high pitched voice, somewhat awkward mannerisms and even how he walked was remarkably accurate.

David Stewart, an independent historical author, writing for History News Network, described Spielberg's work as "reasonably solid history", and told readers of HNN to "go see it with a clear conscience". Lincoln biographer Ronald White also admired the film, though he noted a few mistakes and pointed out in an interview with NPR, "Is every word true? No."

Historian Joshua M. Zeitz, writing in The Atlantic, noted some minor mistakes, but concluded that "Lincoln is not a perfect film, but it is an important film". Following a screening during the film's opening weekend, the Minnesota Civil War Commemoration Task Force held a panel discussion in which Dr. David Woodard of Concordia University remarked, "I always look at these films to see if a regular person who wasn't a 'Lincoln nut' would want to read a book about it after they watched the movie. I get the impression that most people who are not history buffs will now want to read something about Lincoln."

Regarding the historical source material for Kushner's screenplay, legal historian Michael Vorenberg, a professor at Brown University and author of Final Freedom: The Civil War, The Abolition of Slavery, and the Thirteenth Amendment, noted several details throughout the film that "could only have come from [his] book." Among these details were specifics of dealings between Democrats and Thaddeus Stevens, the story behind securing Alexander Coffroth's vote and the fact that African Americans were present in the congressional galleries during the final vote. Ultimately, Kushner replied directly to inquiries from The New Republic writer Timothy Noah, explaining that while he had read Vorenberg's book and many others as research, he insists that Team of Rivals was his principal source material.

Regarding the portrayal of Lincoln's final moments, editor Rhoda Sneller of Abraham Lincoln Online, references a diary entry from Secretary of the Navy Gideon Welles. The entry conflicts with the final scenes in the film in which the dying Lincoln is seen dressed in a nightgown, hunched over in his bed. Welles wrote "The giant sufferer lay extended diagonally across the bed," and "he had been stripped of his clothes." The differences between the first hand account and the present Lincoln serve to paint a more concise and dignified image of the presidents death.

Accolades

Top ten lists 
Lincoln was listed on many critics' top ten lists.

 1st – David Denby, The New Yorker (tied with Zero Dark Thirty)
 1st – Owen Gleiberman, Entertainment Weekly
 1st – Stephen Holden, The New York Times
 1st – Mick LaSalle, San Francisco Chronicle
 2nd – Lisa Schwarzbaum, Entertainment Weekly
 2nd – David Edelstein, New York
 2nd – Betsy Sharkey, Los Angeles Times (tied with Django Unchained)
 2nd – Christopher Orr, The Atlantic
 2nd – Michael Phillips, Chicago Tribune
 2nd –  Ann Hornaday, The Washington Post
 2nd – Huffington Post
 2nd – A. O. Scott, The New York Times
 3rd – Roger Ebert, Chicago Sun-Times
 3rd – Mike Scott, The Times-Picayune
 3rd – James Berardinelli, ReelViews
 3rd –  Mary Pols, Time
 3rd – Dana Stevens, Slate
 4th – Peter Travers, Rolling Stone
 4th –  Rene Rodriguez, Miami Herald
 4th –  Bill Goodykoontz, Arizona Republic
 4th –  Joshua Rothkopf, Time Out New York
 4th –  Alison Willmore, The A.V. Club
 4th – Steven Rea, Philadelphia Inquirer
 5th – Anne Thompson, IndieWire
 5th – Joe Neumaier, New York Daily News
 6th – Ty Burr, Boston Globe
 6th –  David Fear, Time Out New York
 6th –  Kristopher Tapley, HitFix
 6th – Jake Coyle, Associated Press
 6th – Andrew O'Hehir, Salon.com
 7th – Glenn Kenny, MSN Movies
 8th – David Germain, Associated Press
 8th – Lisa Kennedy, The Denver Post
 10th – Melissa Anderson, Village Voice
 10th – Richard Roeper, Chicago Sun-Times
 Top 10 (listed alphabetically) – Bob Mondello, NPR
 Top 10 (ranked alphabetically) – Claudia Puig, USA Today
 Top 10 (listed alphabetically) – Joe Morgenstern, The Wall Street Journal
 Best of 2012 (listed alphabetically, not ranked) – Kenneth Turan, Los Angeles Times

See also 
 Cultural depictions of Abraham Lincoln
 List of films featuring slavery

Notes

References

Further reading 
 Mitchell, Mary Niall. "Seeing Lincoln: Spielberg's Film and the Visual Culture of the Nineteenth Century," Rethinking History 19 (Sept. 2015), 493–505.

External links 

 
 
 
 
 
 
 Lincoln Learning Hub at Disney.com
 Official production notes

2012 films
2012 biographical drama films
2012 drama films
2012 war drama films
2010s American films
2010s political drama films
2010s English-language films
20th Century Fox films
Amblin Entertainment films
American biographical drama films
American Civil War films
American courtroom films
American political drama films
American war drama films
BAFTA winners (films)
Films about Abraham Lincoln
Cultural depictions of Abraham Lincoln
Cultural depictions of Ulysses S. Grant
Drama films based on actual events
Depictions of Abraham Lincoln on film
DreamWorks Pictures films
Dune Entertainment films
Films scored by John Williams
Films about American slavery
Films about presidents of the United States
Films about the United States Army
Films about assassinations
Films based on non-fiction books
Films directed by Steven Spielberg
Films featuring a Best Actor Academy Award-winning performance
Films featuring a Best Drama Actor Golden Globe winning performance
Films produced by Kathleen Kennedy
Films produced by Steven Spielberg
Films set in 1864
Films set in 1865
Films set in the 1860s
Films set in Richmond, Virginia
Films set in Virginia
Films set in Washington, D.C.
Films shot in Virginia
Films set in the White House
Films with screenplays by Tony Kushner
Films whose art director won the Best Art Direction Academy Award
Indian biographical drama films
Indian political drama films
Indian war drama films
Participant (company) films
Political films based on actual events
Reliance Entertainment films
The Kennedy/Marshall Company films
Touchstone Pictures films
War films based on actual events